Pottsgrove Manor, also known as the John Potts House, is a historic home located at Pottstown, Montgomery County, Pennsylvania. It was built in 1752 by John Potts, and is a large two-story, rectangular, sandstone and fieldstone building in the Georgian style. It has a five-bay front facade, gable roof, and a center hall plan. The service wing was added 1790–1805, and the rebuilt east wing was built 1941–1952 during a restoration. It is open to the public as an 18th-century historic house museum owned by Montgomery County.

It was added to the National Register of Historic Places in 1974. It is located in the Old Pottstown Historic District.

References

External links

Pottsgrove Manor website

Historic house museums in Pennsylvania
Museums in Montgomery County, Pennsylvania
Biographical museums in Pennsylvania
Houses on the National Register of Historic Places in Pennsylvania
Georgian architecture in Pennsylvania
Houses completed in 1752
Houses in Montgomery County, Pennsylvania
National Register of Historic Places in Montgomery County, Pennsylvania